The Basque Statistics Office (Eustat) is an autonomous agency of the Basque Government answering to the Department for the Economy and the Treasury, founded on 25 November 1986 pursuant to the Basque Government Decree 251/1986.  Its mission is to collect, analyse and disseminate official statistical information on the relevant aspects of Basque society and the economy.  It also carries out research and development, training and methodological support activities and works in partnership with universities, states institutions and Eurostat.

Its work is subject to the Spanish Personal Data Protection Act 15/1999, which guarantees that Eustat does not facilitate any information that can identify or individualise the suppliers of the information, who are protected by statistical confidentiality. It coordinates two advisory bodies, the Basque Statistics Commission, where the Departments of the Basque Government, the provincial councils and the local councils as producers  of statistics are represented, and the Basque Statistics Council, where all social agents and representatives of society also participate.

Its statistics operations are established in the four-year plans approved by the Basque Parliament  and are implemented through the Annual Statistics Programmes.  The 2005-2008 Basque  Statistics Plan  envisaged 180 operations.

Services
Information Service
Customized statistical information requests
Statistical information on the website
Databank	
Sale of publications
Methodology Advice Service

See also
 Spanish Personal Data Protection Act 15/1999

References

External links
 Official website of Eustat
  Department for the Economy and the Treasury of Basque Government

Basque Government
National statistical services